East Maitland is a suburb in the City of Maitland, New South Wales, Australia.  It is on the New England Highway and it has two railway stations, Victoria Street (opened in 1857 with the Newcastle-Maitland line) and East Maitland (opened initially in 1858). Both stations are served by NSW TrainLink's Hunter Line. Hunter Valley Buses provides bus service.

The traditional owners and custodians of the Maitland area are the Wonnarua people.

Commercial areas 
Green Hills is a major commercial district called which includes the large Stockland Green Hills and The Pavilion which features Aldi, Rebel, Repco and the East Maitland Library. 

There are also shops near Victoria Street railway station.

Schools 

 St Joseph's Primary School, co-ed Catholic primary school at 57 King Street
 East Maitland Primary School, co-ed government primary at 32 William Street
 Linuwel School, alternative co-ed private K-12 located at 133 Morpeth Street
 Maitland High School (formerly Maitland Boys' High School), co-ed government secondary school at 32 High Street
 Maitland Grossman High School (formerly Maitland Girls' High School), co-ed government secondary school on Cumberland Street

Pitnacree Bridge 
Opened on the Hunter River  in 1866. It was located on Pitnacree Road to the Harry Boyle Bridge around 500 meters north east. It was designed as people can travel from Woodville to East Maitland. In 1951 flooding changed the course of the river meaning the  bridge was no longer used.

Population
According to the 2016 census of Population, there were 11,782 people in East Maitland.
 Aboriginal and Torres Strait Islander people made up 4.4% of the population. 
 85.5% of people were born in Australia. The next most common countries of birth were England 2.0% and New Zealand 0.9%.   
 90.2% of people spoke only English at home. 
 The most common responses for religion were Catholic 26.0%, No Religion 24.6% and Anglican 22.7%.

Heritage listings

East Maitland has a number of heritage-listed sites, including:
 18 Day Street: East Maitland Post Office
 John Street: Maitland Gaol
 20 John Street: East Maitland Police Station
 34-40 King Street: 34-40 King Street
 42-44 King Street: Goonoobah
 44 King Street: Woodlands
 Main Northern railway: East Maitland railway station
 Main Northern railway: Victoria Street railway station
 3 Mill Street: Caroline Chisholm Cottage
 91 Newcastle Road: Smith's Flour Mill
 49 Newcastle Street: Englefield
 12 Wallis Street: Oldholme
 47 William Street: St Peter's Anglican Church and Glebe Cemetery

Notable people
 H. V. Evatt, Leader of the Australian Labor Party and Justice of the High Court
 Frederick Lancelot Nott, Member of the Queensland Legislative Assembly
 Les Darcy, world champion boxer, is buried in the Catholic Section of East Maitland Cemetery.

References

 
Suburbs of Maitland, New South Wales